Afghanistan participated in the 2007 Asian Winter Games which was held in Changchun, China from January 28, 2007, to February 4, 2007. This country is represented by 3 athletes competing in the Alpine skiing event.

References

Nations at the 2007 Asian Winter Games
Asian Winter Games
Afghanistan at the Asian Winter Games